Strategy visualization is any kind of (semi-artistic) infographics for visualization of a business strategy.

See also
Visual analytics

External links
http://udleditions.cast.org/strategy_visualize.html
http://de.slideshare.net/StineArensbach/strategic-visualization-17203395

Infographics